Jeunesse Sportive de Kinshasa is a Congolese football club based in Kinshasa and currently playing in the Linafoot, the first level of the Congolese football.

References

Football clubs in the Democratic Republic of the Congo
Football clubs in Lubumbashi